Moss Run is a stream in the U.S. state of Ohio.  It is a tributary to the Little Muskingum River.

Variant names were "Little Morse Run" and "Morse Run". The stream was named after a man with the name Morse, who produced chestnut shingles.

References

Rivers of Ohio
Rivers of Washington County, Ohio